Thelymitra cyanea, commonly known as the veined sun orchid in Australia and as the swamp sun orchid or striped sun orchid in New Zealand, is a species of orchid which is native to New Zealand and south-eastern Australia. It has a single erect, fleshy, channelled leaf and up to five bright blue flowers with darker blue veins. It is usually found growing in swamps, sphagnum bogs, and subalpine herbfields, often in clonal colonies.

Description
There are usually and two bracts on the flowering stem. The side arms of the column are yellow, with a twisted or toothed tip. The flowers are often self-pollinating and open on warm sunny days. Flowering occurs from November to March.

Taxonomy and naming
The veined sun orchid was first formally described in 1840 by John Lindley and given the name Macdonaldia cyanea. The description was published in his book A Sketch of the Vegetation of the Swan River Colony. In 1873 George Bentham changed the name to Thelymitra cyanea and published the change in Flora Australiensis. The specific epithet (cyanea) is derived from the Ancient Greek word kyanos meaning "dark blue".

Distribution and habitat
Thelymitra cyanea is widespread and often common in many parts of south-eastern Australia and New Zealand. It grows in damp to wet boggy places, mainly in montane and subalpine habitats. In New Zealand it is widespread on the North, South and Chatham Islands. In New South Wales it is found on the tablelands south from Ebor, in south-eastern Victoria and in Tasmania. In South Australia it is restricted to near Mount Compass.

Conservation
This orchid is widespread and common, but listed as "endangered" in South Australia where most of its former habitat has been drained and is now under cultivation.

References

External links
 
 

cyanea
Orchids of New South Wales
Orchids of New Zealand
Orchids of South Australia
Orchids of Tasmania
Orchids of the Australian Capital Territory
Orchids of Victoria (Australia)
Plants described in 1840